Blood in the Water is the fourteenth studio album by American thrash metal band Flotsam and Jetsam, which was released on June 4, 2021. It is the band's first release with new bassist Bill Bodily, who had replaced Michael Spencer in November 2020.

Track listing

Personnel
 Eric "A.K." Knutson – vocals
 Michael Gilbert – guitars
 Bill Bodily – bass
 Steve Conley – guitars
 Ken Mary – drums

Charts

References

2021 albums
Flotsam and Jetsam (band) albums